The Yucatán Symphony Orchestra (OSY) is a philharmonic orchestra based in  Mérida, Yucatán, México.

History
The OSY was founded on February, 2001 in Mérida, by the ICY (Domingo Rodriguez, Mari Eli Sosa and Leroy Osmon as organizers under the direction of the governor) and was re-established in 2004 through a joint venture by the Yucatán State Government and the Orquesta Sinfónica de Yucatán foundation. Its main performing venue is the José Peón Contreras theater, renovated in 2011, in Mérida, with a 700-seat capacity. The orchestra's inaugural concert, after being re-established, was on February 27, 2004, under its first conductor, the Colombian Juan Felipe Molano Muñoz. (The first conductor in 2001 of the newly formed symphony was Victor Mayer from Bulgaria.) In early 2009, Juan Carlos Lomónaco came from Mexico City to lead the orchestra.

Conductors
 Victor Mayer (2001 Season only)
 Juan Felipe Molano Muñoz (2004-2007).
 José Luis Chan Sabido (January–June 2008).
 Juan Carlos Lomónaco (January 2009 to Present)

Instrumentation
55 base musicians:
 8 first violins
 7 second violins
 7 violas
 6 violoncellos
 4 bass
 3 flutes
 2 oboes
 2 clarinets
 2 bassoons
 4 horns
 3 trumpets
 3 trombones
 1 tuba
 1 harp
 2 percussionists

References

External links
 

Sinfonica de Yucatan
Yucatán
Musical groups established in 2001
2001 establishments in Mexico